The 705th Combat Training Squadron is a United States Air Force unit stationed at Kirtland Air Force Base, New Mexico.  It is assigned to the 505th Test and Evaluation Group and conducts virtual exercises at all levels of operation.

Function
The 705th Combat Training Squadron is home to the Distributed Mission Operations Center.    The Distributed Mission Operations Center is Air Combat Command's tactical to operational level synthetic battlespace hub.

It consists of 175 Air Force military, government civilian and contractor personnel with backgrounds ranging from air battle managers, pilots, weapons system operators, intelligence, program managers and engineers.

The squadron's Operating Location A was located at the previous-Schriever Air Force Base, Colorado, where it operates the Distributed Mission Operations Center-Space.  It manages Space Flag exercises and was scheduled to transfer to the United States Space Force. In late 2021, Operating Location A became the 392d Combat Training Squadron of the U.S. Space Force, at the renamed Schriever Space Force Base.

History
The origins of the squadron go back to 1979 as an Office of the Secretary of Defense effort to address air defense issues in Central Europe. During the 1990s its focus shifted to joint theater missile defense leading up to the establishment of a full spectrum Distributed Mission Operations capability. The effort was transferred to the 705th Exercise Control Squadron, which was renamed the 705th Combat Training Squadron in 2006.

The squadron manages Virtual Flag theater-level exercises, conducted in a simulated virtual reality world to practice techniques, procedures and tactics all the way from the Joint Terminal Attack Controllers to the Joint Force Air Component Commander.  These exercises take place in a virtual and simulated world with environment generators that replicate the exact threats being faced.

Lineage
 Constituted as the 705th Exercise Control Squadron
 Activated prior to June 2003
 Redesignated 705th Combat Training Squadron in 2006

Assignments
 505th Test and Evaluation Group

Stations
 Kirtland Air Force Base, New Mexico, by 2003 – present

Component
 Operating Location A
 Schriever Air Force Base, Colorado

Awards

References

Notes

Bibliography

Training squadrons of the United States Air Force